The 2021 Rugby Africa Women's Cup format was different from the 2019 edition as it involved a series of test matches. The purpose of the series was to assess teams and to give them an opportunity to exhibit their talent ahead of the newly announced WXV competition.

Test matches

June

July

October

November

References 

2021 in African rugby union
2021 in women's rugby union
Rugby Africa Women's Cup
2021 rugby union tournaments for national teams